George Wright was a former football (soccer) player who represented New Zealand at international level.

Wright made a single appearance in an official international for the All Whites in a 1–4 loss to Australia on 18 July 1936.

References 

Year of birth missing
Possibly living people
New Zealand association footballers
New Zealand international footballers
Association footballers not categorized by position